Cesar Mora is an Australian professional vert skater and a pioneer in vert skating. He has strong beliefs in being a good role model, as he has never believed in the use of drugs, alcohol, or cigarettes Cesar is the only vert skater to compete in all of the 1st ten X Games. In 1998, he won vert gold, and he has two vert silver medals ('95, '99) and a bronze ('00). A number one ranked skater and world champion several times. Skating for Roces skates from 1994 to 1998 then switching to K2 skates from 1999 to 2004. Born in Madrid, Spain, 3 February, and having lived most of his life in Sydney Australia, Cesar represented Australia also in soccer at a youth level, travelling to US and England before landing in his city of birth Madrid and training with professional Spanish side Rayo Vallecano for several months who at the time were in the 4th division of the Spanish league. He returned to Sydney and started skating at the beautiful Bondi Beach where he honed his skills on the ramp and launched himself on an international skating career that took him around the world and back several times. Always creative, explosive and exciting to watch, Cesar made his mark on many up and coming skaters offering a drug-free life style and a healthy living. An artist, not only on the ramp and soccer field, Cesar also loves art, illustration, creative drawing and is a qualified graphic designer. His many achievements didn't go un-noticed and at the change of the century he headlined a video game called Roll, sharing the titles with some of the best skaters in the world. Sometimes referred to as the king of vert, Cesar pushed the sport in 1998 by being the 1st skater in history to land a 1080 and later on that year a reverse 1260. Hailing from the very innovative Australian skating scene he always tried to push the boundaries and try new things, create new ways of performing tricks and innovating, adding his unique style to everything he did, and with these efforts and risks comes injuries, he certainly had his share but somehow managed to avoid broken bones until the end of 2000 whilst performing at the melbourne planet x games he fell and broke his left arm and wrist. The physical recovery was fast but the mental recovery took some time, and that year he took on less competitions and concentrated on healing and safety. Once the confidence returned the usual big tricks were on display and among the variety of spins, flips and airs for many years he was known for his giant backflips, always a crowd pleaser. Cesar, ever the showman, never left a ramp without giving his all, whether it be the x games or a small show in a village in Peru where the ramp may have been less than appropriate. He always wanted to leave the kids and fans with something special and signed every autograph. He relished his position as a role model and this made him actually wear a helmet, because when he started and on his 1st tour of the states he never liked wearing a helmet and was told no helmet-no skate. A proud person with an enviable list of achievements, he relished his time on tour and is always grateful of anyone who helped him along the way.

Vert Competitions 
1995 X Games - Providence - 2nd
1995 ASA Pro Tour - Chicago - 1st
1995 ASA Pro Tour - CA-2nd
1995 ASA Pro Tour - New York - 2nd
1995 ASA Pro Tour Champion
1995 NISS - Portland - 1st
1995 NISS Tour Finals - Venice Beach - 1st
1996 ASA Pro Tour - Miami - 1st 
1996 Ultimate Inline Challenge, Universal Studios - Orlando - 3rd
1996 NISS Tour Finals - Huntington Beach - 3rd
1996 NISS - Miami - 2nd
1996 IISS - Cairns - 1st
1996 Tour of South America
1997 Tour of Thailand
1997 Tour of South America
1997 NISS - Tour Finals - Santa Monica -2nd
1997 ASA Pro Tour - Boston - 1st
1997 Planet X Games - Gold Coast - 2nd
1997 Ultimate Inline Challenge, Universal Studios - Orlando - 2nd
1997 MTV Sports and Music Festival - Austin, Texas - 1st
1997 ASA Pro Tour Finals - Florida - 3rd
1998 ASA Pro Tour - Ontario - 2nd
1998 ASA Pro Tour - Virginia Beach - 2nd
1998 ASA Pro Tour - Boston 1st
1998 X-Air Hamilton, NZ - 1st
1998 ASA World Pro Tour Champion
1998 ASA World Pro Tour Finals - Las Vegas - 1st
1998 ASA Pro Tour - Colorado - 1st
1998 X Games - San Diego - 1st
1998 Planet X Games - Brisbane - 1st
1998 Australian Titles - 1st
1998 Texas Ho Down - 1st
1998 NISS - New York - 2nd
1998 K2 Challenge - Vert - 1st
1998 K2 Challenge - High Air - 1st
1998 Skaters Choice Winner
1998 ESPN B3 - Woodward - 2nd
1998 Ultimate Inline Challenge - Orlando - 3rd
1998 IISS - Puerto Rico - 1st
1999 IISS - Puerto Rico - 2nd
1999 NISS - Huntington Beach - 1st
1999 X Games - San Francisco - 2nd
1999 ESPN B3 - Oceanside - 1st
1999 ESPN B3 - Portland - 1st
1999 ESPN B3 - Kentucky - 2nd
1999 Judges Choice Winner
1999 Number 1 Ranked Skater
1999 Gravity Games - Providence - 3rd
1999 Levis Anti Drug High School Tour USA
2000 X Games - San Francisco - 3rd
2000 Number 1 Ranked Skater
2000 ESPN B3 - Louisville - 2nd
2000 ESPN B3 - Lake Havasu - 3rd
2001 Planet X Games - Sydney - 2nd
2003 ASA Pro Tour - Los Angeles - 3rd
2003 ASA Pro Tour - Milwaukee - Vert: - 3rd
2003 X-Air Hamilton - NZ - 2nd
2003 ASA Pro Tour - Milwaukee, WI: - 2nd
2003 ASA Pro Tour - Los Angeles - 3rd
2003 Kellogs USA Tour
2004 Asian X Games - Malaysia - 2nd
2007 Vodafone X-Air, Wellington, New Zealand - 3rd

References

External links
rollerblading.com.au
grindtv.com
lgactionsports.com
expn.go.com
lgactionsports.com
reocities.com
expn.go.com

1975 births
Living people
Vert skaters
X Games athletes